Kodiyal is a census town in Haveri district in the Indian state of Karnataka.

Demographics
 India census, Kodiyal had a population of 6726. Males constitute 52% of the population and females 48%. Kodiyal has an average literacy rate of 72%, higher than the national average of 59.5%: male literacy is 79%, and female literacy is 66%. In Kodiyal, 12% of the population is under 6 years of age.

References

Cities and towns in Haveri district